Ayaka Inoue (born 15 January 1995) is a Japanese professional footballer who plays as a forward for WE League club Omiya Ardija Ventus.

Club career 
Inoue made her WE League debut on 12 September 2021.

References 

Japanese women's footballers
Living people
1995 births
Women's association football forwards
Association football people from Tochigi Prefecture
Omiya Ardija Ventus players
Mynavi Vegalta Sendai Ladies players
WE League players